Nuri Şahin (born 5 September 1988) is a football manager and former professional player who played as a central midfielder. He is the manager of Antalyaspor.

He began his career at Borussia Dortmund, spending six years there – including a year-long loan at Feyenoord – and winning the Bundesliga in 2011 before signing for Real Madrid in 2011 for €10 million. In August 2012, Şahin agreed to a one-year loan deal with Liverpool, which was terminated in January 2013 to allow him to return to Dortmund on an 18-month loan. This was then made permanent, and he stayed at Dortmund until his transfer to Werder Bremen in August 2018.

Born in Germany, Şahin represented Turkey at international level and did so since the under-16 level. He made his senior international debut in 2005 and earned 52 caps before retiring in 2017.

Personal life
Şahin was born to Turkish parents in Lüdenscheid and grew up in nearby Meinerzhagen. He has been married to his cousin Tuğba Şahin (née Emeni) since November 2007. In September 2011, she gave birth to a son, Ömer, in Madrid. Şahin is fluent in five languages: Turkish, German, English, Dutch and Spanish. In April 2018, Şahin enrolled at Harvard Business School.

Club career

Early career
Şahin began his football career at the age of six for RSV Meinerzhagen. After spending seven seasons at the club, he was signed by professional club Borussia Dortmund in 2001.

Borussia Dortmund
On 6 August 2005, at the age of 16 years and 334 days, Şahin set a record by becoming the youngest player to have played in the Bundesliga (this was later surpassed by Youssoufa Moukoko on 21 November 2020 at the age of 16 years and 1 day). On 25 November of the same year, Şahin became the youngest player to score a goal in the Bundesliga, scoring for Borussia Dortmund against 1. FC Nürnberg (this was later surpassed by Florian Wirtz on 6 June 2020 at the age of 17 years and 34 days).

On 5 July 2007, Şahin was transferred to Feyenoord in the Eredivisie on a one-year loan agreement, where he was reunited with Bert van Marwijk, his former coach at Borussia Dortmund.

Şahin returned to Dortmund, where he played an important role in the 2009–10 season, starting 33 out of 34 matches. He ended the season with four goals and eight assists. Şahin won the Bundesliga title with Dortmund in the 2010–11 season. After a strong season, in which he scored six goals and had eight assists, he was voted the Bundesliga player of the season.

Real Madrid
On 9 May 2011, after weeks of speculation, Şahin announced his departure from Dortmund in a press room at Signal Iduna Park. He signed a six-year contract with Real Madrid of La Liga. The transfer fee paid to Dortmund amounted to €10 million. He stated the main reason to join Real Madrid was because of José Mourinho and the chance of playing for a club as prestigious as Real Madrid. He made his official debut as a substitute in a 7–1 thrashing of CA Osasuna at the Santiago Bernabéu on 6 November 2011, as he had been sidelined by injury problems since August earlier that year. On 20 December 2011, he scored his first goal for Real Madrid as they thrashed SD Ponferradina 5–1 in the Copa del Rey. On 27 March 2012, he was named in the starting XI to face APOEL in the UEFA Champions League quarter-final, where his performance was praised by Mourinho and various newspapers.

Liverpool (loan)

On 25 August 2012, Real Madrid agreed to loan Şahin to Liverpool on a season-long deal, where he was given the number 4 shirt. On 2 September 2012, Şahin made his Liverpool debut in the 2–0 home defeat to Arsenal in the Premier League. On 26 September, Şahin scored his first and second goal for Liverpool in the third round of the League Cup against West Bromwich Albion as the game ended in a 2–1 win. He scored his first Premier League goal and set up two goals, three days later in a 5–2 win against Norwich City. In his five-month loan spell at Liverpool, Şahin managed to get three goals and three assists in 12 matches. After leaving Liverpool, Şahin said he was never happy at either Real Madrid or Liverpool, though he was happy to get a chance to play with captain Steven Gerrard.

Return to Borussia Dortmund

On 14 January 2013, Liverpool announced that they had in agreement with all parties terminated the loan agreement with Real Madrid and Şahin, and that this would now allow Şahin to join Borussia Dortmund on loan until the end of the 2013–14 season. Şahin spoke about the deal saying, "I realised that as a footballer and a human being, I belong here 100 per cent." Şahin also said "I noticed quickly that I only want to play for Dortmund." His return move delighted manager Jürgen Klopp. Prior his debut in the friendly match against Mainz, in which Dortmund won on penalties, Şahin said he was quite nervous for his return. Eight days later, he made his first league appearance, since leaving Dortmund, coming on as a substitute in a later minute, as Dortmund defeated Werder Bremen 5–0. On 16 March 2013, Şahin scored two goals in a 5–1 Dortmund victory over SC Freiburg.

On 27 July 2013, Şahin won the 2013 DFL-Supercup with Dortmund 4–2 against rivals Bayern Munich. On 26 October 2013, Şahin scored a goal for Dortmund in the Revierderby against rivals Schalke in a 3–1 win for Dortmund.

On 10 April 2014, Borussia Dortmund activated a clause in Sahin's contract that allowed him to return permanently for a fee reported to be in the region of €7 million.

The preparation for the 2014–15 season was marked by injuries; he was sidelined early on due to an irritation in the joint capsule of his knee and tendinitis. In September 2014, inflamed tissue was removed from Sahin's left knee. After the surgery, he was out for around nine weeks, and returned to team practice on 12 November 2014. After playing seven league games, Şahin was diagnosed with tendon irritation in the upper adductor area in March 2015, whereupon he was sidelined for the rest of the season and for the entire first half of the 2015–16 season. 

After a break of almost a year, he made his comeback in the UEFA Europa League game against Porto on 18 February 2016. After İlkay Gündoğan's move to Manchester City, Şahin received his old shirt number 8 back. 

On 25 April 2017, Şahin extended his contract with Dortmund by another year until 2019.

Werder Bremen

On 31 August 2018, the last day of the 2018 summer transfer window, Şahin joined Bundesliga rivals SV Werder Bremen. According to media reports, he signed a two-year contract moving to the club on a free transfer. As a defensive midfielder, he was originally intended to be the successor to the departed Thomas Delaney, but initially alternated in this position with Philipp Bargfrede and made 23 appearances in his first season, in which he was able to both score and assist a goal. In the DFB-Pokal, Şahin was knocked out in the semi-finals with Werder to eventual winner Bayern Munich. In the first half of the 2019–20 season, Şahin appeared regularly, but lost his place in the team in February 2020 in favor of the duo Davy Klaassen and Maximilian Eggestein. After 17 games that season for Bremen, in which he assisted four goals, he suffered a hip injury in early-June which would again sideline him for a long while.

Antalyaspor
In August 2020, Şahin moved to Turkish Süper Lig club Antalyaspor, where he signed a two-year contract.

International career
Şahin won the bronze ball prize at the 2005 Under-17 World Cup in Peru after a successful tournament with Turkey, finishing in fourth place. Şahin is the youngest player to have played and scored for Turkey. Notably, he scored during his debut which was a match against Germany, the country of his birth.

Career statistics

Club

International

Source:

Scores and results list Turkey's goal tally first, score column indicates score after each Şahin goal.

Managerial statistics

Honours
Feyenoord
KNVB Cup: 2007–08

Borussia Dortmund
Bundesliga: 2010–11
DFB-Pokal: 2016–17
DFL-Supercup: 2013
UEFA Champions League runner-up: 2012–13

Real Madrid
La Liga: 2011–12

Turkey U17
UEFA European Under-17 Championship: 2005

Individual
UEFA European Under-17 Championship Golden Player: 2005
FIFA U-17 World Cup Bronze Ball: 2005
FIFA U-17 World Cup Silver Shoe: 2005
 VDV Bundesliga Player of the Season: 2010–11
kicker Bundesliga Player of the Season: 2010–11
kicker Bundesliga Team of the Season: 2010–11
ESM Team of the Year: 2010–11

Further reading
 Metzger, S., & Özvatan, Ö. (2020). Games of Belonging: Football, Boundaries and Politics between Germany and Turkey. Nationalities Papers, 48(4), 737-751. doi:10.1017/nps.2019.4

References

External links

 
 
 
 

1988 births
Living people
People from Lüdenscheid
Sportspeople from Arnsberg (region)
Footballers from North Rhine-Westphalia
Turkish footballers
Turkish football managers
Turkey international footballers
Turkey under-21 international footballers
Turkey youth international footballers
Citizens of Turkey through descent
German footballers
German football managers
German people of Turkish descent
German expatriate sportspeople in the Netherlands
German expatriate sportspeople in Spain
German expatriate sportspeople in England
Association football midfielders
Bundesliga players
Regionalliga players
Borussia Dortmund players
Borussia Dortmund II players
SV Werder Bremen players
Antalyaspor footballers
Eredivisie players
Feyenoord players
La Liga players
Süper Lig players
Real Madrid CF players
Premier League players
Liverpool F.C. players
Turkish expatriate footballers
German expatriate footballers
Expatriate footballers in the Netherlands
Expatriate footballers in Spain
Expatriate footballers in England
Turkish expatriate sportspeople in England
Turkish expatriate sportspeople in Spain
Turkish expatriate sportspeople in the Netherlands
UEFA Euro 2016 players